Amy is an unincorporated community in Howell County, Missouri, United States.

History
A post office called Amy was established in 1891, and remained in operation until 1931. The community has the name of Amy Black, the daughter of a postal official.

In 1925, Amy had 19 inhabitants.

References

Unincorporated communities in Howell County, Missouri
Unincorporated communities in Missouri